Kirill Aleksandrovich Stolbov (born 8 April 2004) is a Russian football player who plays for FC Yenisey Krasnoyarsk on loan from FC Zenit Saint Petersburg.

Club career
He made his debut in the Russian Premier League for FC Zenit Saint Petersburg on 21 May 2022 in a game against FC Nizhny Novgorod.

Career statistics

References

External links
 
 
 
 

2004 births
Footballers from Saint Petersburg
Living people
Russian footballers
Russia youth international footballers
Association football midfielders
FC Zenit-2 Saint Petersburg players
FC Zenit Saint Petersburg players
FC Yenisey Krasnoyarsk players
Russian Second League players
Russian Premier League players
Russian First League players